Concord School District may refer to a school district in the United States:

Concord School District (Arkansas)
Concord School District (New Hampshire)